Omotunde Adebowale David, popularly known as Lolo1, is a Nollywood actress, and a Nigerian radio presenter. She hosted the radio programme, ‘Oga Madam’ on Wazobia FM 95.1, till 2019 when she left and joined Lasgidi FM as the general manager and an on-air personality.

Early life and education 
She attended Ijebu-Ode Anglican Girls secondary school where she also spent part of her school days in a hostel. She is a graduate of Law from Lagos State University and she later went to law school.

Career 
She started her career as a legal practitioner after being called to the bar in 2000. She worked in the law department before dropping it for media broadcasting in 2004.
She is also known for acting, in Yoruba and English movies. She featured in the TV series Jenifa's Diary where she acted as Adaku.
She became an On Air Personality for the first time when she joined Metro FM. She later joined Wazobia FM, then she left in 2019 after over 11 years with them.

She got the nickname Lolo1 during a radio live show when she requested a nickname from people and she eventually picked lolo.

She was featured in the cover page for La Mode Magazine for July 2017 edition.

She played the role of Ms. Wilson in the 2018 film We Don’t Live Here Anymore by Tope Oshin.

In 2020 she produced her first movie titled When Love is not Enough. The movie was directed by Okiki Afolayan.

She was announced as the first ambassador of Awabah,  Micro Pensions company.

Magazine Feature 
The last issue of La Mode magazine was fantastic with Chika Ike, but this current issue is even hotter! This new issue is all about beauty, strength, and curves and features fashion entrepreneur Temi Aboderin-Alao and radio personality Omotunde Adebowale David nicknamed Lolo1.

Awards and nominations 
 Nigerian Broadcasters Merit Award for Outstanding Radio Program Presenter- Lagos

Personal life 
She is a single mother of three sons and a daughter.

References 

Living people
Lagos State University alumni
1977 births
Nigerian radio presenters
Nigerian women radio presenters
Nigerian film actresses
Nigerian film producers
Actresses from Ogun State
Nigerian lawyers
Nigerian women comedians